Ben Neequaye (22 August 1980 – 2006) was a Ghanaian boxer. He competed in the men's light welterweight event at the 2000 Summer Olympics.

As a professional he won the West African Boxing Union (WABU) lightweight title.

References

External links
 
 

1980 births
2006 deaths
Ghanaian male boxers
Olympic boxers of Ghana
Boxers at the 2000 Summer Olympics
Place of birth missing
African Games medalists in boxing
Lightweight boxers
Light-welterweight boxers
African Games bronze medalists for Ghana
Competitors at the 1999 All-Africa Games